World University was an accredited university based in Puerto Rico, which was in operation from 1965 to 1989.

The University was founded by Ronald S. Bauer, President of World University 
(aka: International Institute of the Americas – World University ó Instituto Internacional de las Américas de la  Universidad Mundial). The University was accredited by the Middle States Association of Colleges and Universities and the Council of Puerto Rico Accreditation of Higher Learning. There are/were many notable graduates from this institution. Two notable alumni were public health innovator Ron Rivera and Prof., Rev. Richard Salvatore Esposito, Ph.B,MSc., L.O.C.M.., Class of 1978. Prof. Esposito has enjoyed a Worldwide speaking career highlighted by addressing, by special invitation, the United Nations in two special sessions in Geneva, Switzerland. He sat under the teachings of the highly respected Dr. Lorraine Casby, Ph.D, Ed.D. 1974–1978. Graduated with Honors.

World University was a dynamic, innovative unmatched institution of higher learning. One of its unique courses, Dev. of World Cultures was unparalleled introducing the students to a universe of knowledge in the fields of religion, music, philosophy, science, and technology. Dr. Lorraine Casby, Ph.D, Ed.D. was one of its leaders.

References

Universities and colleges in Puerto Rico
Educational institutions established in 1965
Educational institutions disestablished in 1989
Defunct private universities and colleges in Puerto Rico
1965 establishments in Puerto Rico